Billy McShepard (born August 10, 1987) is an American professional basketball player for Maccabi Ashdod B.C. of the Israeli National League. He played college basketball for Louisburg College and Valdosta State.

Early life and college career
McShepard attended Bertie High School in Windsor, North Carolina. He played college basketball for Louisburg College and Valdosta State.

In his senior year at Valdosta State, he averaged 9.8 points, 8.6 rebounds and 1 block per game.

Professional career
On August 3, 2016, McShepard signed a one-year deal with Ironi Nes Ziona. In 18 games played for Nes Ziona, he averaged 14.1 points, 9.9 rebounds and 1.2 steals per game.

On November 26, 2018, McShepard returned to Israel for a third stint, signing with Elitzur Eito Ashkelon. McShepard finished the season as the league fourth best rebounder with 11.4 rebounds per game, to go with 19.2 points per game.

On August 18, 2019, McShepard signed with Elitzur Yavne for the 2019–20 season.

Career statistics 

|-
| align="left" | 2017-18
| align="left" | Yamagata
|56 ||7 || 24.4 ||.444  || .302 ||.738 || 8.9 || 1.8 || 1.1 ||0.9  || 16.8
|-

References

External links
 RealGM profile
 Eurobasket profile

1987 births
Living people
American expatriate basketball people in Argentina
American expatriate basketball people in Austria
American expatriate basketball people in Germany
American expatriate basketball people in Israel
American expatriate basketball people in Japan
American expatriate basketball people in Taiwan
American men's basketball players
Centers (basketball)
Elitzur Eito Ashkelon players
Elitzur Yavne B.C. players
Ironi Nes Ziona B.C. players
Louisburg Hurricanes men's basketball players
Passlab Yamagata Wyverns players
Power forwards (basketball)
San Lorenzo de Almagro (basketball) players
Sioux Falls Skyforce players
Swans Gmunden players
Texas Legends players
Valdosta State Blazers men's basketball players